5th Season is the fourth studio album by the German progressive metal band Dreamscape.

Track listing 

 "Fed Up With" – 5:29
 "Borderline" – 5:12
 "5th Season" – 14:35
 "Deja Vu" – 5:27
 "Somebody" – 4:28
 "Phenomenon" – 7:48
 "Different" – 7:10
 "Point Zero" – 7:57
 "Farewell" – 5:06

2007 albums
Dreamscape (band) albums
Massacre Records albums